Alberta Provincial Highway No. 11A is the designation of two routes that connect to Highway 11 (David Thompson Highway) in Alberta, Canada. The Rocky Mountain House section is referred to as 11A:02 by Alberta Transportation, while 11A:06 runs from Sylvan Lake to Red Deer.

Rocky Mountain House 
Highway 11A:02 begins at the Range Road 80 junction with Highway 11. It follows Range Road 80 south to Township Road 393, where it heads east to Rocky Mountain House, providing an alternate crossing of the North Saskatchewan River than Highway 11. Within Rocky Mountain House it is also known as 52 Avenue, and runs concurrent with Highway 752. Extending north past Highway 11, Highway 11A becomes Highway 756 as an entrance to Crimson Lake Provincial Park, extending east past Highways 11 and 22, Highway 11A becomes Highway 598.

Major intersections 
Starting from the north end of Highway 11A:

Sylvan Lake - Red Deer 
Highway 11A:06 is a rare alternate route (lettered highway), in that it does not intersect its parent route, Highway 11. It follows Township Road 390 from Highway 20 in Sylvan Lake to Highway 2A in Red Deer, it can be connected to Highway 11 with any of the Highways 20, 2, 2A or the four grid roads in between. The western terminus extended to Highway 11 near Benalto up to 2008/2009, before being dropped by Alberta Transportation. Highway 11A is known as Lakeshore Drive in Sylvan Lake, and 82 Street in Red Deer.

This section of Highway 11A, including the decommissioned stretch between Benalto and Sylvan Lake, was the original route of Highway 11 before it was rerouted along 67 Street and 30 Avenue in Red Deer and extended east in the late 1980s. This section passes by the Wild Rapids Waterslides.

The City of Red Deer is also planning to construct the North Highway Connector, also known as Northland Drive, which will serve as a northern bypass for Highway 11.  Phase I of the bypass at the Highway 2A / Highway 11A intersection along Northland Drive, cross the Red Deer River, and connect with Highway 11 at the 30th Avenue / 67th Street intersection; while Phase II would follow 20th Avenue.  It remains to be seen if the bypass will be signed as part of Highway 11A.

Major intersections 
Starting from the west end of Highway 11A:

References 

011A
Transport in Red Deer, Alberta